Rav  (or Rab,) is the Hebrew generic term for a person who teaches Torah; a Jewish spiritual guide; or a rabbi. For example, Pirkei Avot (1:6) states that: 

The term rav is also Hebrew for rabbi. (For a more nuanced discussion, see semicha.) The term is frequently used by Orthodox Jews to refer to their own rabbi.

In contemporary Judaism, as the term rabbi has become commonplace, the term rav has come to apply to rabbis with levels of knowledge, experience, and wisdom in excess of those found among the majority of rabbis who serve Jewish congregations as a career. In some cases, rav thus refers to full-time scholars of Torah who do not receive compensation.

Overview
In the Talmud, the title Rav generally precedes the names of Babylonian Amoraim; Rabbi generally precedes the names of ordained scholars in the Land of Israel whether Tannaim or Amoraim.

In the Talmud, Rav or Rab (used alone) is a common name for the first Amora, Abba Arika, who established the Sura Academy and, using the Mishnah as text, laid the foundation for the Talmud's compilation.

In some Hasidic groups, the Rebbe is also referred to as a Rav. In other circles, the Rav is distinct from the Rebbe but the highest Dayan—a rabbinical court justice—of the group.

The Rav
Nachmanides will sometimes refer to Maimonides as HaRav, "The Rav".

From the 16th century and onwards, Rav or the Rav generally referred to Rabbi Obadiah ben Abraham, a.k.a. haRav miBartenura (the Rav from Bartenura). Rabbi Obadiah miBartenura becomes the Hebrew acronym Rabbi `Obadiah of B'''artenura (רע"ב).

More recently, as a sign of great respect, some rabbis are simply called the Rav even outside of their personal followings. Note that when the word is pronounced using a patakh, the meaning is almost universally rabbi Obadiah ben Abraham of Bartenura. When using a kamatz, the term can refer to, among others:
 Rabbi Joseph Soloveitchik: Among Centrist and Modern Orthodox Orthodox Jews, particularly in North America. Sometimes spelled "The Rov".
 Rabbi Shneur Zalman of Liadi: His Code of Jewish Law is often called the Shulchan Aruch HaRav, "Shulchan Aruch of the Rav" .
 The Vilna Gaon: The line of his disciples and their actual descendants (who include both of the Rabbis Soloveitchik on this list) is called Beit HaRav, "The House of the Rav."
 The Brisker Rav: In most Haredi yeshivos, Rabbi Joseph Soloveitchik is referred to by his Yiddish name (Rav Yoshe Ber), and the term Rov (kamatz pronounced as in Ashkenazic) means the Brisker Rav.
 Rabbi Abraham Isaac Kook: His followers in Israel will often refer to him as "The Rav"; the school he founded is commonly called "Merkaz HaRav", "The Rav's Center".
 Rabbi Moshe Feinstein: A leading halachic authority of his generation from the mid to late 20th century; his p’sakim (halachic rulings) were accepted worldwide.

In a synagogue
When Orthodox Jews say "The Rav said..."  within a synagogue, it is fairly likely that they're referring to the rabbi of the synagogue.

The title Rav HaTzair (or Rav HaTza'ir) refers to an assistant rabbi. Tzair means young, in Hebrew, and the prefix Ha means "the"; therefore, the combination can be used to mean the younger of a pair: Rav HaTzair'', in context, can refer to the younger of a pair of rabbis, or Junior Rav.

See also
 Rebbe
 Honorifics in Judaism
 list of people called Rabbi

References

Orthodox rabbinic roles and titles